was a  of the Imperial Japanese Navy. She was among the several ships sunk during Operation Ten-Go by attacking US aircraft in 1945.

Service career and fate

On 29 February 1944, while escorting a large convoy en route to Truk, Asashimo detected the submarine  making a night surface approach on the convoy. Rock fired a spread of four torpedoes from her stern tubes at the closing Asashimo without scoring a hit. Illuminated by the destroyer's searchlight, and under fire from the ship's 5-inch (130 mm) guns, Rock dived. For four hours Asashimo continued depth charge attacks, without success. That night Rock surfaced and found that her periscopes were excessively damaged and that her bridge had been riddled with shrapnel. The damage necessitated a return to Pearl Harbor for repairs. Later that night, the busy Asashimo sank the submarine . Japanese records indicate that one of their convoys, Matsu No. 1, was attacked by a submarine on 29 February 1944 in the patrol area assigned to Trout. The submarine badly damaged one large passenger-cargo ship and sank the 7,126-ton transport Sakito Maru. About 2,200 of the 3,500 men aboard the Sakito Maru died, which included a large portion of the 18th Infantry Regiment. Asashimo detected the submarine and dropped 19 depth charges. Oil and debris came to the surface and the destroyer dropped a final depth charge on that spot. The submarine was using Mk.

Asashimo participated in the Battle of the Philippine Sea. During the Battle of Leyte Gulf, she rescued survivors of the cruiser  on 23 October. At the Battle of Ormoc Bay, she was the only destroyer to survive the Convoy TA no. 4 Battle. On 26 December 1944, she assisted in scuttling the destroyer  and rescued 167 crewmen, plus her C.O. and Comdesdiv2.

On 6 April 1945, Asashimo escorted the battleship  from the Inland Sea on Operation Ten-Go towards Okinawa. All of her 326 crew members - as well as Commander Destroyer Division 21 (Captain Hisao Kotaki) - lost their lives. The others, including the destroyer , were sunk during the same attack, also by aircraft of San Jacinto, but several destroyers, such as  survived with heavy damage.

See also 
 Operation Kita
 Operation Ten-Go
 List of ships of the Imperial Japanese Navy

References

External links
CombinedFleet.com: Yūgumo-class destroyers
CombinedFleet.com: Asashimo history

Yūgumo-class destroyers
World War II destroyers of Japan
Destroyers sunk by aircraft
1943 ships
World War II shipwrecks in the East China Sea
Ships lost with all hands
Maritime incidents in April 1945
Ships sunk by US aircraft
Ships built by Fujinagata Shipyards